John Hampson (28 December 1887 – December 1960) was a Welsh footballer who played for Oswestry Town, Northampton Town, Leeds City, Aston Villa, and Port Vale.

Career
Hampson played for Oswestry Town, Northampton Town and Leeds City, before joining Aston Villa in October 1919. He played eight First Division matches in the 1919–20 season and six games in the 1920–21 campaign. He joined Port Vale for a £1,000 fee in June 1921. He went straight into the first team, and scored in his first game at The Old Recreation Ground, in a 3–0 victory over Clapton Orient on 29 August. He also claimed goals in home victories over West Ham United and Bury and posted 30 Second Division appearances in the 1921–22 season, and was also a member of the side that shared the North Staffordshire Infirmary Cup in 1922. He scored four goals in 39 league and cup games in the 1922–23 campaign, finding the net in a 2–1 win over Manchester United at Old Trafford (7 October), in a 2–0 win over Stockport County at Edgeley Park (9 December), in a 2–1 home defeat by Leeds United (30 December), and in a 2–2 draw at home to The Wednesday (5 May). He bagged two goals in 33 appearances in the 1923–24 season, scoring in home games against Barnsley and South Shields, but sustained a serious injury in April which required a number of operations. He left the club in the summer and later played for Hanley Social Club.

Career statistics

Honours
Port Vale
North Staffordshire Infirmary Cup: 1922 (shared)

References

Sportspeople from Oswestry
Welsh footballers
Association football defenders
Oswestry Town F.C. players
Northampton Town F.C. players
Aston Villa F.C. players
Leeds City F.C. players
Port Vale F.C. players
English Football League players
1887 births
1960 deaths